Maria Mazziotti Gillan is an American poet.

Life
Maria Mazziotti Gillan was born March 12, 1940, in an Italian enclave in Paterson, New Jersey's Riverside neighborhood.

She attended Paterson public schools and is a graduate of Eastside High School.

She graduated from Seton Hall University and from New York University with an MA In literature. She enrolled in a Ph.D. program at Drew University from 1977 to 1980. She married Dennis Gillan; they have two children, John and Jennifer, and two grandchildren, Caroline and Jackson.

She is the founder and executive director of the Poetry Center at Passaic County Community College in Paterson, New Jersey, and editor of the Paterson Literary Review, and is the director of the creative writing program and professor of poetry at Binghamton University-SUNY.  Gillan founded Poetry Center at Passaic County Community College in 1980, after receiving a grant from the State Council on the Arts, and featured speakers including Allan Ginsberg, Amiri Baraka, and Stanley Kunitz.

She has published 22 books. One of her most recent is The Girls in the Chartreuse Jackets (Redux Consortium, 2014), a collection of her poetry and watercolor artwork. Her craft book, Writing Poetry to Save Your Life: How to Find the Courage to Tell Your Stories (MiroLand, Guernica) was published in 2013.

She is co-editor with her daughter Jennifer of four anthologies: Unsettling America, Identity Lessons, and Growing Up Ethnic in America (Penguin/Putnam) and Italian-American Writers on New Jersey (Rutgers).

Since 2012 she has been in the Honour Committee of Immagine & Poesia, the artistic literary movement founded in Turin, Italy, with the patronage of Aeronwy Thomas (Dylan Thomas's daughter).

She lives in Hawthorne, New Jersey, and is a professor emeritus at SUNY-Binghamton.
In 2020 she adheres to the Empathic Movement (Empathism).

Awards
 2011 Barnes & Noble Writers for Writers Award from Poets & Writers
 2008 American Book Award for her book, All That Lies Between Us
 2008 [Chancellor’s Award for Scholarship and Creative Endeavor] from Binghamton University
 2008 [Sheila Motton Award]
 2014 AWP George Garrett Award

Works

Poetry
"After School on Ordinary Days"; "Growing Up Italian"; "Daddy, We Called You"; "The Black Bear On My Neighbors Lawn in New Jersey"; "Love Poem to My Husband of Thirty-One Years"; "I Dream of My Grandmother and Great Grandmother"; "Paterson"; "Learning to Love Myself"; "Public School #18"; "Watching the Bridge Collapse"; "How The Dead Return"; "Last Night at the Hampton Inn"; "Sometimes I forget How Fragile the Heart Is"; "On Being Italian"; "Photo of My Sister"; "At Eleven, My Granddaughter Loves to Read"; "The Ghosts in Our Bed"; "Breakfast at the I Hop"; "Your Voice on the Phone Wobbles"; "In Second Grade" "How Do I Pack Up the House of My Life?"; "Couch Buddha"; "Poem to John"; "In My Dream, I see You"; "My Father Always Bought Used Cars"; "My Son Tells Me Not to Wear My Poet's Clothes"
 I Am Sitting at the Table, in Prairie Schooner
 poetry sampler

Books of poetry
 The Weather of Old Seasons, Cross-Cultural Communications, 1989, 
 Where I Come From, 1995, Guernica Editions, 
 Things My Mother Told Me, Guernica Editions, 1999, 
 Italian Women in Black Dresses, Guernica, 2002, 
 Maria Mazziotti Gillan: Greatest Hits 1975-2002, Pudding House Publications, April 2003, 
 Talismans/Talismani, Ibiskos Editions, 2006, 
 All That Lies Between Us, Guernica Editions, 2007, 
 What We Pass On: Collected Poems 1980-2009, Guernica Editions, 2010, 
 The Place I Call Home, NYQ Books, 2012, 
 Ancestors' Song, Bordighera Press, 2013, 
 The Silence in an Empty House, NYQ Books, 2013, 
 The Girls in the Chartreuse Jackets, Redux Consortium, 2014,

Anthologies

Editor
 Italian American Writers on New Jersey, editors Maria Mazziotti Gillan, Jennifer Gillan, Edvige Giunta, Rutgers University Press, November 2003
 Identity Lessons, editors Maria M. Gillan, Jennifer Gillan, Penguin Putnam, 1999 
 Growing Up Ethnic in America: Contemporary Fiction About Learning to Be American, editors Maria Mazziotti Gillan, Jennifer Gillan, San Val, Incorporated, 1999 
 Unsettling America: An Anthology of Contemporary Multicultural Poetry, editors Maria Mazziotti Gillan, Jennifer Gillan, Paw Prints, 2008

References

External links
"Maria Mazziotti Gillan Official Site"
"Maria Mazziotti Gillan Official Blog"
"Maria Mazziotti Gillan Books"
"Maria Mazziotti Gillan: Poet & Editor Italian American Writers of New Jersey", Italian American Writers

Papers of Maria Mazziotti Gillan, MSS 89, Monsignor William Noe Field Archives at Seton Hall University.

1940 births
Binghamton University faculty
Seton Hall University alumni
New York University alumni
Drew University alumni
Living people
American women poets
American Book Award winners
American women academics
21st-century American women